Alexander Graham Mitchell (2 November 1923 – 18 July 2010) was the first Governor of the Turks and Caicos from April 1973 to May 1975. He had previously served as the last Administrator of the islands from 1971 to 1973. He went on to serve as Bursar of Dame Allan's Schools. Mitchell died in Corbridge, Northumberland, England in July 2010 at the age of 86.

References

1923 births
2010 deaths
Administrators of the Turks and Caicos Islands
Governors of the Turks and Caicos Islands